Felix Anthony "Tippy" Martinez (born May 31, 1950), is an American retired professional baseball left-handed pitcher. He pitched 14 seasons in Major League Baseball (MLB) between 1974 and 1988, primarily as a relief pitcher. The majority of his career (1976–1986) was spent as a member of the Baltimore Orioles, where he was a member of 1983 World Series championship team.

Career
Martinez was drafted by the Washington Senators in the 35th round of the 1969 amateur draft, but did not sign with the team. He began his MLB career with the New York Yankees in 1974 after signing as a free agent. 

He was acquired along with Rick Dempsey, Scott McGregor, Rudy May and Dave Pagan by the Orioles for Ken Holtzman, Doyle Alexander, Elrod Hendricks, Grant Jackson and Jimmy Freeman at the trade deadline on June 15, 1976. He, Dempsey and McGregor became part of a nucleus that kept the Orioles as perennial contender for the next decade, culminating with the 1983 World Series championship.
  
Martinez may be best known for picking off three Toronto Blue Jays at first base in one inning during the August 24, 1983, game at Baltimore's Memorial Stadium. The baserunners were Barry Bonnell, Dave Collins and Willie Upshaw.  The Orioles, having replaced both their starting catcher and his backup while rallying to tie the game in the ninth inning, entered the tenth with reserve infielder Lenn Sakata in the game at catcher. Three consecutive Blue Jays hitters reached first base and each one, thinking it would be easy to steal a base on Sakata, took a big lead. Martinez picked off all three baserunners, then became the winning pitcher when the Orioles won the game on Sakata's home run in the bottom of the tenth.

A grassroots fan club was created for Tippy Martinez near the bullpen in left field of Memorial Stadium in 1980, called "Tippy's Tweeters". Fans blew on an official Oriole Tweeter every time Martinez entered a game as a reliever, and when he struck out the side.

Martinez finished his MLB career with the Minnesota Twins in 1988. He posted a lifetime win–loss record of 55–42 with an ERA of 3.45. He also recorded 115 saves.

In December 2006, Martinez became the pitching coach of the York Revolution of the Atlantic League of Professional Baseball.

See also
List of Major League Baseball leaders in games finished

References

External links

Tippy Martinez at Pura Pelota (Venezuelan Professional Baseball League)
 Newspaper article
 Box score of the three-pickoff game, Aug. 24, 1983
 Baltimore Sun article on the 25th anniversary of the three-pickoff game

1950 births
Living people
American League All-Stars
American people of Mexican descent
Baltimore Orioles players
Baseball players from Colorado
Bradenton Explorers players
Cardenales de Lara players
American expatriate baseball players in Venezuela
Colorado State Rams baseball players
Daytona Beach Explorers players
Hagerstown Suns players
Kinston Eagles players
Major League Baseball pitchers
Minnesota Twins players
New York Yankees players
Oneonta Yankees players
Rochester Red Wings players
Syracuse Chiefs players
Tigres de Aragua players
People from La Junta, Colorado